The 2017 CS Autumn Classic International is a figure skating competition that took place in September 2017 at the Sportsplexe Pierrefonds in Montreal, Quebec. It is part of the 2017–18 ISU Challenger Series. Medals were awarded in the disciplines of men's singles, ladies' singles, pair skating, and ice dance.

Entries 
The International Skating Union published the preliminary list of entries on August 29, 2017.

 Withdrew before starting orders drawn
 Men:  Vincent Zhou

Results

Men 
Yuzuru Hanyu set a new world record for the short program (112.72 points).

Ladies

Pairs

Ice dance

References

Citations

External links 
 
 2017 CS Autumn Classic International at the International Skating Union

CS Autumn Classic International
2017 in Canadian sports
Sports competitions in Montreal
Autumn Classic International
2017 in Quebec